HMS Rover was an 18-gun sloop launched on 17 July 1832 from the Chatham Dockyard and broken up in 1845.

References

External links
 

1832 ships
Ships built in Chatham